Alburnus mento is a species of freshwater fish, a bleak  in the family Leuciscidae. Its distribution is in subalpine lakes in Germany and Austria.  

Previously, the concept of A. mento was broader, and its distribution was thought to be broader. It was known as the Danube bleak.

References

mento
Fish described in 1837